Colorvision may refer to:
 Color vision, the ability of an organism or machine to distinguish objects based on the wavelengths (or frequencies) of the light they reflect, emit, or transmit.
 Color Visión, a television network based in the Dominican Republic
 Romtec Colorvision, an tabletop/handheld video game console from 1984
 Color Vision, a 2020 album by Max Schneider